Rudolf Nebel (21 March 1894 – 18 September 1978) was a spaceflight advocate active in Germany's amateur rocket group, the Verein für Raumschiffahrt (VfR – "Spaceflight Society") in the 1930s and in rebuilding German rocketry following World War II.

Early life and involvement in World War I

Nebel was born in Weißenburg. During the First World War he served in the Luftstreitkräfte as a fighter pilot with Jagdstaffel 5, pioneering the use of unguided air-launched signal rockets as offensive armament from a German fighter aircraft in the Luftstreitkräfte while flying the Halberstadt D.II in early 1916, even forcing down two British aircraft with the improvised rocket armament. Following the war, the former Leutnant Nebel earned a degree in engineering.

Activities in civilian rocketry and politics before the Second World War

He was an early member of the German Society for Space Travel (VfR), working closely together with persons such as Wernher von Braun, Rolf Engel, Hermann Oberth or Paul Ehmayr and assisted with the failed publicity stunt to launch a rocket at the premiere of Fritz Lang's film Frau im Mond (Woman in the Moon). Despite this failure, Nebel continued to seek sponsorship from the Reichswehr as well as individuals as diverse as Adolf Hitler and Albert Einstein.

Nebel acted very much as the group's spokesperson, organising the donation of materials from various local businesses, and negotiating with the Berlin municipal council for the use of a disused ammunition dump for the VfR's launch site or Raketenflugplatz. He later talked the Magdeburg council into funding the launch of a rocket with a human passenger on board (Magdeburger Startgerät).

His right-wing politics and affiliation with the paramilitary veterans' organization Der Stahlhelm sat easily with his promotion of the possible military uses of rockets. Despite this, he had a difficult relationship with 
Karl Becker of the Army Weapons Office. Becker distrusted Nebel's showmanship and publicity seeking and by May 1931 had temporarily cut off official contact with him. In April 1932, Becker accepted a proposal from Nebel for army funding of a rocket launch on the condition that certain criteria were met. The launch on 22 June of that year was a failure and Nebel and his crew received no payment for the attempt. When Becker offered to bring the team into a strictly controlled army rocketry project, Nebel refused, saying that he and his colleagues had invented the technology and that the army would "choke us with their red tape". Conversely, Wernher von Braun and others accepted the offer.

Von Braun later tried again during the war to have him join, but by now the SS regarded Nebel as untrustworthy and had von Braun cease his attempts.

Post-war career

After World War II, Nebel was quick to encourage Germany to recommence rocket research. He participated in the first meetings of the International Astronautical Federation and held a public lecture in Cuxhaven in 1951 that set in motion a chain of events that led to the old military base being re-opened for rocket launching until the mid-1960s.

He died in Düsseldorf.

Nebel, whose name means "fog" in German, is often incorrectly named as the inventor of the Nebelwerfer ("fog launcher") system of rocket artillery used by the Wehrmacht (German army) in World War II. This secret weapon was given its name as a disinformation strategy designed to lead spies into thinking that it was merely a device for creating a smoke screen.

References

1894 births
1978 deaths
People from Weißenburg in Bayern
People from the Kingdom of Bavaria
German rocket scientists
German spaceflight pioneers
Early spaceflight scientists
Technical University of Munich alumni
Luftstreitkräfte personnel
Officers Crosses of the Order of Merit of the Federal Republic of Germany
German World War I pilots
Military personnel from Bavaria